Fisher County is a county located in the U.S. state of Texas. As of the 2020 census, its population was 3,672. The county seat is Roby. The county was created in 1876 and later organized in 1886. It is named for Samuel Rhoads Fisher, a signer of the Texas Declaration of Independence and a Secretary of the Navy of the Republic of Texas. Fisher County was one of 30 prohibition, or entirely dry, counties in Texas, but is now a fully wet county.

History

 10000 BC - Paleo-Indians were the first inhabitants. Later Native American inhabitants include the Pawnee, Wichita and Waco, Lipan Apache, Kiowa, and Comanche.
 1876 - The Texas legislature formed Fisher County from Bexar districts. The new county was named after Samuel Rhoads Fisher.
 1880 - The census reported 136 inhabitants.
 1881 - The Texas and Pacific Railway routed an east–west branch through Eskota.
 1885 - The town of Fisher was registered. Swedish immigrants founded the community of Swedonia.
 1886 - The town of North Roby was registered. Roby eventually won the county seat election over Fisher, but one of the voters, a Mr. Bill Purp, was later discovered to have been actually a dog whose owner lived near Roby.
 1920 - Fisher County was among Texas leaders in wheat production.
 1926 - Cotton became king, as 48,000 bales were ginned in the county.
 1928 - Oil was discovered in the county.
 1970 - The county's average annual farm income was evenly divided between livestock and crops.

Geography

Major highways
  U.S. Highway 180
  State Highway 70
  State Highway 92

Adjacent counties
 Stonewall County (north)
 Jones County (east)
 Taylor County (southeast)
 Nolan County (south)
 Mitchell County (southwest)
 Scurry County (west)
 Kent County (northwest)

Demographics

Note: the US Census treats Hispanic/Latino as an ethnic category. This table excludes Latinos from the racial categories and assigns them to a separate category. Hispanics/Latinos can be of any race.

As of the census of 2000,  4,344 people, 1,785 households, and 1,244 families resided in the county.  The population density was five people per square mile (2/km2).  The 2,277 housing units averaged two per square mile (1/km2).  The racial makeup of the county was 83.75% White, 2.76% Black or African American, 0.37% Native American, 0.14% Asian, 11.58% from other races, and 1.40% from two or more races.  About 21.36% of the population were Hispanic or Latino of any race.

Of the 1,785 households, 27.60% had children under the age of 18 living with them, 58.90% were married couples living together, 8.10% had a female householder with no husband present, and 30.30% were not families. About 28.30% of all households were made up of individuals, and 17.80% had someone living alone who was 65 years of age or older.  The average household size was 2.39 and the average family size was 2.93.

In the county, the population was distributed as 23.90% under the age of 18, 6.30% from 18 to 24, 23.00% from 25 to 44, 24.10% from 45 to 64, and 22.70% who were 65 years of age or older.  The median age was 43 years. For every 100 females, there were 92.90 males.  For every 100 females age 18 and over, there were 89.80 males.

The median income for a household in the county was $27,659, and for a family was $34,907. Males had a median income of $25,071 versus $20,536 for females. The per capita income for the county was $15,120.  About 13.50% of families and 17.50% of the population were below the poverty line, including 27.40% of those under age 18 and 10.50% of those age 65 or over.

Communities

Cities
 Hamlin (mostly in Jones County)
 Roby (county seat)
 Rotan

Unincorporated communities
 Hobbs
 Longworth (birthplace of Poker Hall of Fame inductee Doyle Brunson)
 McCauley
 Sylvester

Ghost Towns
 North Roby
 Royston

Politics
Fisher County was one of the last rural yellow dog counties in Texas to switch from consistently voting for Democratic candidates to favoring Republican candidates. From 1921 to 1925, the Democrat Richard M. Chitwood of Sweetwater represented Fisher County in the state House. He left his post to become the first business manager of Texas Tech University, but died the next year.

See also

 Dry counties
 Double Mountain Fork Brazos River
 Clear Fork Brazos River
 Salt Fork Brazos River
 National Register of Historic Places listings in Fisher County, Texas
 Recorded Texas Historic Landmarks in Fisher County

References

External links
 Fisher County government's website
 
 Fisher County Profile from the Texas Association of Counties 

 
1886 establishments in Texas
Populated places established in 1886